This is a list of songs which reached number one on the Billboard Mainstream Top 40 chart in 2007.

During 2007, a total of 13 singles hit number-one on the charts.

Chart history

See also
2007 in music

References

External links
Current Billboard Pop Songs chart

Billboard charts
Mainstream Top 40 2007
United States Mainstream Top 40